Second-seeded Doris Hart defeated Louise Brough 6–8, 6–1, 8–6 in the final to win the women's singles tennis title at the 1954 U.S. National Championships and completed the career grand slam in singles. 
Maureen Connolly was the three-time defending champion, but was unable to defend her title after a horse riding accident.

Seeds
The eight seeded players are listed below. Doris Hart is the champion; others show in brackets the round in which they were eliminated.

  Louise Brough (finalist)
  Doris Hart (champion)
  Beverly Baker Fleitz (quarterfinals)
  Margaret Osborne duPont (third round)
  Shirley Fry (semifinals)
  Betty Pratt (quarterfinals)
  Helen Perez (second round)
  Lois Felix (quarterfinals)

Draw

Key
 Q = Qualifier
 WC = Wild card
 LL = Lucky loser
 r = Retired

Final eight

References

1954
1954 in women's tennis
1954 in American women's sports
Women's Singles